Calvin Lane Alley (October 10, 1915 – November 10, 1970) was the editorial cartoonist for The Commercial Appeal in Memphis, Tennessee, from 1945 until 1970.

Hambone's Meditations
Born in Memphis, Cal Alley was the son of James Pinckney Alley, creator of the syndicated cartoon panel Hambone's Meditations, and the first editorial cartoonist at The Commercial Appeal in 1916. Hambone's Meditations ran on the front page of The Commercial Appeal. 

When the elder Alley died April 16, 1934, his wife Nona, Cal Alley, and his brother James took over Hambone's Meditations.

The character of Hambone was inspired by J. P. Alley's encounter with a philosophical ex-slave, Tom Hunley, of Greenwood, Mississippi. Hunley told a WPA interviewer how he met J. P. Alley:

Pressure from civil rights groups brought the racist cartoon series to an end in 1968.

Editorial cartoons and The Ryatts
In 1939, Alley began his cartoon career in Missouri where he was an editorial cartoonist with the Kansas City Journal. When the Journal folded in 1942, he moved on to the Nashville Banner.

Three years later, he signed on with The Commercial Appeal, where he launched a comic strip, The Ryatts, syndicated by the Post-Hall Syndicate from 1954 to 1994. Comics historian Don Markstein noted:

Alley's sister, Elizabeth Alley, was married to Frank Ahlgren, editor of The Commercial Appeal from 1936 to 1968.

Awards
Alley received the Sigma Delta Chi Distinguished Service Award for a 1955 editorial cartoon. He was inducted into the Tennessee Hall of Fame which "honors those who have made an outstanding contribution to Tennessee Newspaper journalism or, through Tennessee journalism, to newspaper journalism generally, or who have made an extraordinary contribution to their communities and region, or the state, through newspaper journalism."

Alley retired in 1965 and died of cancer five years later at the age of 55.

References

External links
 Lambiek: Cal Alley
 Hambone's Meditations, San Antonio Express, May 9, 1931.

1915 births
1970 deaths
American comic strip cartoonists
American editorial cartoonists
Artists from Tennessee
People from Memphis, Tennessee